Pauline Parmentier was the defending champion, but chose not to participate that year.

Sorana Cîrstea won her first WTA Tour singles title, defeating Sabine Lisicki in the final, 2–6, 6–4, 7–6(7–4).

Seeds

  Peng Shuai (semifinals)
  Olga Govortsova (first round)
  Sorana Cîrstea (champion)
  Sabine Lisicki (final)
  Magdaléna Rybáriková (semifinals, retired due to an illness)
  Monica Niculescu (quarterfinals)
  Akgul Amanmuradova (first round)
  Galina Voskoboeva (withdrew due to an illness)

Draw

Finals

Top half

Bottom half

External links
Draw and Qualifying Draw

Singles
2008 WTA Tour
2008 in Uzbekistani sport